Shubham Desai (born 28 February 1996) is an Indian cricketer. He made his List A debut on 29 September 2019, for Goa in the 2019–20 Vijay Hazare Trophy. He made his Twenty20 debut on 8 November 2019, for Goa in the 2019–20 Syed Mushtaq Ali Trophy.

References

External links
 

1996 births
Living people
Indian cricketers
Goa cricketers
Place of birth missing (living people)